The Xueyantuo were an ancient Tiele tribe and khaganate in Northeast Asia who were at one point vassals of the Göktürks, later aligning with the Tang dynasty against the Eastern Göktürks.

Names

Xue 
Xue 薛 appeared earlier as Xinli 薪犁 in Sima Qian's Records of the Grand Historian, vol. 110 but were not referred to again until the 7th century. Golden (2011) proposed that 薛 Xue's Old Turkic form Sir derived from Sanskrit Śrī "fortunate, auspicious"

Yantuo 
The etymology of Yantuo 延陀 is much debated. It was first identified with Tarduš, one of two divisions, besides Töliš, of the short-lived Xueyantuo Qaghanate, by Western Orientalists (like Vilhelm Thomsen) who considered Töliš and Tarduš to be tribal names. The ethnonym is thus reconstructable as Syr-Tardush. However, Chinese scholars viewed Töliš and Tarduš as names of political organizations or districts: for example, Cen Zhongmian viewed the Töliš-Tarduš division as east–west whereas Wang Jingru, citing New Book of Tang, viewed Töliš-Tarduš as north–south.

Sergey Klyastorny (2003:305), apud Golden (2018), proposed that Xueyantuo transcribed *Sir-Yamtar; in contrast to the tribal name Sir, [Ïšβara] Yamtar appeared as a personal name of one companion of Kül Tigin, mentioned the eponymous inscription in his memory.

Tongdian recorded the origin of Yantuo: "During the reign of Murong Jun in the Former Yan, the Xiongnu chanyu Helatou (賀剌頭, "the leader of the Alat tribe") led his tribe of thirty-five thousand people and came to surrender. Yantuo people are probably their descendants." Based on this, Bao (2010) proposed that Yantuo people were the descendants of the Alat tribe, also known as Ala-Yundluğ; therefore, the name Yantuo was probably derived from Yundluğ, and Xueyantuo can be reconstructed as Sir-Yundluğ.

History

Initially the Xue and the Yantuo were two separate tribes.  Tongdian states that: "Xueyantuo is a splinter tribe from Tiele. In the time of Former Yan [emperor] Murong Jun, Xiongnu Shanyu Helaitou led his tribe, numbering 35,000, to come surrender. Yantuo are probably their descendants. With the Xue tribe [Yantuo] live intermixed. Thus the appellation Xueyantuo. The Khagan clan's surname is Yilitu. For generations they have been a strong nation." The rulers of Xueyantuo claimed to be originally named Xue (薛/偰), and that the name of the tribe was changed to Xueyantuo after the Xue defeated and merged the Yantuo into their tribe.

After Yishibo, the Xueyantuo founded a short-lived Qaghanate over the steppe under Zhenzhu Khan, his son Duomi Khan and nephew Yitewushi Khan, the last of whom eventually surrendered to the Tang dynasty.

In 605, Xueyantuo were attacked by the Western Türkic Chuluo Khagan. Consequently, they abandoned the Western Turks and established their own Kaganate under a leadership of Qibi tribe's Yağmurčin Bağa-Qağan, retaining the control and income from the Turfan segment of the Silk Road. Later, Xueynatuo leader Yshbara was installed as a lesser Kagan Yetir (yeti er "seven tribes"). In the 610, Shekui (r. 610-617) ascended to the Western Turkic throne, both rulers renounced their Kagan ranks and rejoined the Western Türkic Kaganate. The next Western Türkic Tong-Yabgu-Kagan (r. 617-630) annexed all seven tribes of the Xueyantuo-headed Tiele confederation, which also included Uighur, Bayïrku, Ădiz, Tongra, Bugu and Barsil tribes. in 627 Xueyantuo leader led his tribes into the territory of the Eastern Türkic Kaganate, defeated the main force of the Kaganate led by the son of the reigning Illig Qaghan, Yukuk Shad, and settled in the valley of river Tola in the Northern Mongolia. After the victory, Uighur leader Yaoluoge Pusa assumed a title huo xielifa ( *kat-elteber or *war-hilitber) and split from the confederation, and in 629 the Xueyantuo Yinan-erkin declared himself Inčü Bilge-Khagan of a new Xueyantuo Kaganate.

This Xueyantuo Kaganate was quickly recognized by the Tang Empire, as a counterweight against its enemy Eastern Türkic Kaganate. "Raising Yi'nan on Kagan throne was done under pressure from the Tang court interested in stripping El-kagan of the rights to the supreme power in the huge region, and also in final dismemberment of the Türkic state, a source of many conflicts on their northern borders." Xueyantuo provided military service by assisting the Tang Empire against the Tatars in the 630s. The Xueyantuo's vast khaganate spanned from the Altai Mountains to the Gobi desert.

On March 27, 630, the Xueyantuo allied with the Tang to defeat the Eastern Qaghanate in the Yin Mountains. Illig Qaghan escaped, but was handed over to the Tang by his subordinate qaghan on May 2.

After Eastern Göktürk Illig Qaghan Ashina Duobi was defeated by Tang in 630, the Xueyantuo effectively took over control of the Eastern Göktürks' former territory, at times submissive to the Tang and at times warring with the Tang and the subsequent khan of the Eastern Göktürks that Tang supported, the Qilibi Khan Ashina Simo.

In 632 the Xueyantuo repulsed an army of Si Yabgu Qaghan from the Western Qaghanate, then subjugated the Qarluq at the Ulungur and Irtysh River, and then the Yenisei Kyrgyz tribes. In 634 one of their rivals, Dubu Qaghan (Ashina Shier), son of Chuluo Khan, who ruled much of the eastern half of the Western Qaghanate, was eliminated before escaping to the Tang dynasty.

After that they maintained a friendly relationship with the Tang until 639, when a raid on the Tang capital was planned by the Gökturks under Ashina Jiesheshuai (阿史那结社率), who had been disparaged by the Tang emperor. He allied with his nephew Ashina Heluohu (阿史那贺逻鹘), choosing him as the leader of the raid on May 19. They were unsuccessful and over 40 rebels were executed. Heluohu was spared and expelled to the far south.

After this incident, an arraignment was made on August 13. A deportation of all Goktürks north of Ordos was carried out, in an attempt to restore the puppet Eastern Qaghanate as a barrier against the Xueyanto, in an attempt to distract them from the territorial competition in the west.

Among the Göktürk nobles, Ashina Simo was selected as the qaghan (Qilibi Khan) with his capital at the border. The plot failed, as he was unable to gather his people, many of his tribesmen having escaped to the south by 644 after a series of unsuccessful incursions by the Xueyantuo supported by the Tang dynasty. Defeats by the advancing Tang troops had made their tribal allies lose confidence in them. The crisis deepened the next year when a coup d'état took place within the clan.

On August 1, 646, the Xueyantuo were defeated by the Uyghur (Huihe, 回纥) and the Tang. The Xueyantuo's Duomi Khan, Bazhuo, was killed by the Uyghur. A Tang army led by the general Li Daozong, the Prince of Jiangxia, crushed the Xueyantuo forces. The last Xueyantuo khan, the Yitewushi Khan Duomozhi, surrendered. Their remnants were destroyed two years later, on September 15. The Sir re-appeared later as [Al]tï Sir "Six Sir Tribes", subjects of the Latter Turk ruler Bilge Khagan; Klyashtorny controversially proposed that Sir were precursors to Kipchaks.

Xueyantuo's relationship with the later Shatuo Turks is contested.  The epitaph of Shatuo leader Li Keyong states that his clan's progenitor was "Yidu, Lord of the Xueyantuo country, an unrivaled general" (益度、薛延陀國君、無敵將軍).  However, Chinese chroniclers also traced the Shatuo's origins to a Tiele chief named *Bayar (拔也 Baye) ~ *Bayïrku (拔也古 Bayegu) or Western Turkic  Chuyue 處月 (often identified with Chigils).

Khans of Xueyantuo 
 Yishibo (乙失缽), the Yiedie Khan (也咥可汗) (?-628?)
 Yi'nan (夷男), the Zhenzhupiqie Khan (真珠毗伽可汗) or, in short, Zhenzhu Khan (真珠可汗) (628-645)
 Bazhuo (拔灼), the Jialijulishixueshaduomi Khan (頡利俱力失薛沙多彌可汗) or, in short, Duomi Khan (多彌可汗) (645-646)
 Duomozhi (咄摩支), the Yitewushi Khan (伊特勿失可汗) (646)

Under Second Turkic Khaganate 
 Küli Čur, Ïšbara Bilge Küli Čur (?-c. 723)

Surname of Khans 
The surname of Xueyantuo's khans is uncertain, although modern Chinese historian Bo Yang lists their surname as "Yishi" in his edition (also known as the Bo Yang Edition) of the Zizhi Tongjian, but without citing a source. It is possible that Bo was influenced by the Tongdian, which refers to the Xueyantuo surname as Yilitu 壹利吐, Yiliduo 一利咄 as in Cefu Yuangui, Yilidie 壹利咥 as in New Book of Tang. Li Keyong's epitaph also records his alleged Xueyantuo ancestor's name as Yidu 益度.

According to Cen Zhongmian, the aforementioned names are related to a variant of elteris. Duan Lianqin asserted that the name Yishibo (Yiedie Khan) can also be read interchangeably as Yedie (也咥). The Zizhi Tongjian, in the original, referred to one ethnic Xueyantuo general named Duomo, possibly the Yitewushi Khan (after he became a Tang general) by the family name of Xue—although the Tang Huiyao indicated that it was not the same person, as it indicated that the Yitewushi Khan died during Emperor Taizong's reign.

Surnames of Xueyantuo
Li (李)
Liu (刘)
Xie (偰)
Xue (薛)
Zhang (張)

See also
List of Turkic dynasties and countries
Timeline of Turks (500-1300)
Xue
Selenga River
Later Tang
Sir-Kıvchak

References

Citations

Sources 

 Bo Yang. Modern Chinese Edition of Zizhi Tongjian (Vol. 45). Taipei: Yuan-Liou Publishing Co. Ltd .
 Duan Lianqin (1988a). Xueyantuo During the Period of Sui and Tang. Xi'an: Sanqin Press. .
 Duan Lianqin (1988b). Dingling, Gaoju and Tiele. Shanghai: Shanghai People's Press. .
 New Book of Tang, vol. 217, part 3 .
 Zizhi Tongjian, vols. 192, 193, 194, 195, 196, 197, 198, 199.
 Zuev Yu.A. "Xueyantuo Khaganate and Kimeks. ([A Contribution] to Turkic ethnogeography of Central Asia in the middle of 7th century)" in Shygys, Oriental Studies Institute, Almaty (2004), No 1 pp 11–21, No 2 pp 3–26 (in Russian)
 Zuev Yu.A., Horse Tamgas from Vassal Princedoms (Translation of Chinese composition "Tanghuyao" of 8-10th centuries), Kazakh SSR Academy of Sciences, Alma-Ata, I960, (In Russian)

 
Turkic peoples of Asia
Ancient peoples of China
7th century in China
Ancient peoples of Russia
Nomadic groups in Eurasia
History of Mongolia
Tang dynasty
Former countries in Chinese history
7th-century establishments in China
646 disestablishments
7th-century disestablishments in China
Göktürks